Skrjabinodon is a genus of nematodes belonging to the family Pharyngodonidae.

The species of this genus are found in America, Australia and Malesia.

Species:

Skrjabinodon alcaraziensis 
Skrjabinodon caudolumarius 
Skrjabinodon crassicauda 
Skrjabinodon heliocostai 
Skrjabinodon mascomai 
Skrjabinodon medinae 
Skrjabinodon poicilandri 
Skrjabinodon spinosulus 
Skrjabinodon trimorphi

References

Nematodes